In American football, a smashmouth offense is an offensive system that relies on a strong running game, where most of the plays run by the offense are handoffs to the fullback or tailback. It is a more traditional style of offense that often results in a higher time of possession by running the ball heavily. So-called "smash-mouth football" is often run out of the I-formation or wishbone formation, with tight ends and receivers used as blockers. Though the offense is run-oriented, pass opportunities can develop as defenses play close to the line. Play-action can be very effective for a run-oriented team.

"Three Yards and a Cloud of Dust"
This term describes run-heavy offenses such as those used by coach Woody Hayes of Ohio State University in the 1950s and 1960s. A grind-it-out ball control offense, it relies on time of possession utilizing a high percentage of inside running plays off of handoffs by the quarterback to advance the ball down the field. Hayes relied primarily on the fullback off-tackle play. A quarterback under Hayes would often throw fewer than 10 passes a game. Hayes is credited as saying "Three things can happen when you pass the ball, and two of them are bad".

Run to Daylight
The central two plays in this philosophy are off-tackle run and the so-called Packers sweep. In both plays, the offensive line would work to seal off a running lane for the back to use, and the running back would aim for this corridor rather than a specific pre-snap hole. In the off-tackle run, the quarterback would hand off (often to the fullback) who started running to the position between the tight end and tackle, but would aim for the best hole that developed. In the sweep, the two guards would pull to form the outside wall of the running lane, while the center and run side tackle would form the inside wall of the lane. The fullback would lead the path through the lane for the half back, who received a pitch from the quarterback.

College teams that used the Smashmouth offense
 Nebraska Cornhuskers
 Stanford Cardinal
 Fresno State Bulldogs
 Wisconsin Badgers
 Arkansas Razorbacks
 Alabama Crimson Tide
 Ohio State Buckeyes

NFL teams that used the Smashmouth offense

Notes

References

American football strategy